Ein Sarid is a moshav in central Israel. Located in the Sharon plain, it falls under the jurisdiction of Lev HaSharon Regional Council.

History
Before the 20th century the area formed part of the Forest of Sharon. It was an open woodland dominated by Mount Tabor Oak, which extended from Kfar Yona in the north to Ra'anana in the south. The local Arab inhabitants traditionally used the area for pasture, firewood and intermittent cultivation. The intensification of settlement and agriculture in the coastal plain during the 19th century led to deforestation and subsequent environmental degradation.

The village was founded in 1950 on the site of the depopulated Palestinian village of al-Nuseirat, as a ma'abara. It was expanded in 1989 and again in 1994; the new part becoming known as Ein Sarid HaHadasha (lit. New Ein Sarid).

References

External links
Official website

Moshavim
Populated places established in 1950
Populated places in Central District (Israel)
1950 establishments in Israel